The Clovis station, also known as the Clovis Depot, was built in 1907. It was listed on the National Register of Historic Places in 1995.

History 
The station was built by B. Lantry & Sons in Spanish Revival style, and is one of only three buildings of this style built by the Santa Fe Railway.

Notably it served long distance Chicago to California trains that took the route through Wichita, Kansas; northwest Oklahoma and Amarillo in northern Texas. This was in contrast to the more northerly route which went through Dodge City, Kansas and Albuquerque, New Mexico.

Trains 
Trains included:
California Limited (Chicago – Los Angeles) (to 1954)
California Special (Clovis – Temple, Texas) (to 1967)
Grand Canyon Limited (Chicago – Los Angeles) (to 1968)
San Francisco Chief (Chicago – San Francisco) (1954–1971)
Scout (Chicago – Los Angeles, with secondary section to Oakland) (to 1954)

References

Railway stations on the National Register of Historic Places in New Mexico
Mission Revival architecture in New Mexico
Railway stations in the United States opened in 1907
National Register of Historic Places in Curry County, New Mexico
Atchison, Topeka and Santa Fe Railway stations in New Mexico
1907 establishments in New Mexico Territory
Clovis, New Mexico
Transportation in Curry County, New Mexico
Former railway stations in New Mexico